The Snowshoe Trail is a 1922 American silent Western film directed by Chester Bennett and starring Jane Novak, Roy Stewart and Lloyd Whitlock.

Cast
 Jane Novak as Virginia Tremont
 Roy Stewart as Bill Bronson
 Lloyd Whitlock as Harold Lounsbury
 Herbert Prior as George Edmunson
 Kate Toncray as Mrs. Bronson
 Spottiswoode Aitken as John Lounsbury
 Chai Hong as Hop Sing
 William McCall as Fur Trapper

References

Bibliography
 Munden, Kenneth White. The American Film Institute Catalog of Motion Pictures Produced in the United States, Part 1. University of California Press, 1997.

External links
 

1922 films
1922 Western (genre) films
American black-and-white films
Films directed by Chester Bennett
Film Booking Offices of America films
Films set in Alaska
Silent American Western (genre) films
1920s English-language films
American silent feature films
1920s American films